Anioł Stróż (Guardian Angel) is a Polish television comedy series that premiered on September 5, 2005 on TVN. The series was directed by Filip Zylber. It is broadcast every Monday at 9:30 pm on channel TVN.

Plot 
Anna Górska is a new divorcee with two children, Martyna and Kuba. Trying to make ends meet, she decides to return to work, but needs to hire someone to look after the children. Together with her sister Beata, Anna gets the idea to hire someone in exchange for living under their roof.

Cast

References

External links 
Official profile in Filmpolski.pl database

2005 Polish television series debuts
2005 Polish television series endings
TVN (Polish TV channel) original programming